Copake United Methodist Church and Copake Cemetery is a historic United Methodist church on Church Street in Copake, Columbia County, New York.  The church was built about 1854 and is a one-story, timber frame meeting house style church with Greek Revival style design attributes.  It features a stoutly proportioned, four columned Ionic order portico and a two tiered belfry.  The church is set within Copake Cemetery.  The earliest burial dates to 1757 and most of the stones date to the first decades of the 19th century.

It was listed on the National Register of Historic Places in 2007.

References

External links
 

United Methodist churches in New York (state)
Churches on the National Register of Historic Places in New York (state)
Churches completed in 1854
Cemeteries on the National Register of Historic Places in New York (state)
Churches in Columbia County, New York
Cemeteries in Columbia County, New York
Methodist cemeteries
1854 establishments in New York (state)
National Register of Historic Places in Columbia County, New York